The 1997 World Figure Skating Championships were held at the CIG de Malley in Lausanne, Switzerland on March 16–23. Medals were awarded in the disciplines of men's singles, ladies' singles, pair skating, ice dancing.

Medal tables

Medalists

Medals by country

Competition notes
At age 14, Tara Lipinski became the youngest skater to win the World title in ladies' singles.

Results

Men
1994 Olympic champion Alexei Urmanov withdrew with a groin injury.

Stojko became the first skater to win a world title with a successful 4T-3T.

Referee:
 Britta Lindgren 

Assistant Referee:
 Katsuichiro Hisanaga 

Judges:
 Marie Reine le Gougne 
 Agnes Morvai 
 Sally Rehorick 
 Sviatoslav Babenko 
 George Iashvili 
 Zoya Yordanova 
 Paula Naughton 
 Daniela Cavelli 
 Sissy Krick 

Substitute judge:
 Merja Kosonen

Ladies

Referee:
 Sally-Anne Stapleford 

Assistant Referee:
 Hely Abbondati 

Judges:
 Josette Betsch 
 Alexander Pentchev 
 Maria Zuchowicz 
 Christa Gunsam 
 Judit Fürst-Tombor 
 Jan Hoffmann 
 Gloria Morandi 
 Hisashi Yoshikawa 
 Adriana Domanska 

Substitute judge:
 Bettina Meier

Pairs

Referee:
 Walburga Grimm 

Assistant Referee:
 Markus German 

Judges:
 Frank Parsons 
 Ulf Denzer 
 Debbie Islam 
 Alexei Shirshov 
 Marina Sanaya 
 Anna Sierocka 
 Ubavka Novakovic-Kytinoy 
 Laura McNair 
 Lucy J. Brennan 

Substitute judge:
 Evgenia Bogdanova

Ice dancing

Referee:
 Wolfgang Kunz 

Assistant Referee:
 Roland Wehinger 

Judges:
 Robert Horen 
 Gilles Van Den Broeck 
 Halina Gordon-Poltorak 
 John Greenwood 
 Irina Absaliamova 
 Isabella Micheli 
 Evgenia Karnolska 
 Mary Parry 
 Heide Maritczak 

Substitute judge:
 Sumiko Kobayashi

References

External links
 1997 Worlds results 

World Figure Skating Championships
World Figure Skating Championships
Sports competitions in Lausanne
20th century in Lausanne
March 1997 sports events in Europe